Orb-weaver spiders are members of the spider family Araneidae. They are the most common group of builders of spiral wheel-shaped webs often found in gardens, fields, and forests. The English word "orb" can mean "circular", hence the English name of the group. Araneids have eight similar eyes, hairy or spiny legs, and no stridulating organs.

The family has a cosmopolitan distribution, including many well-known large or brightly colored garden spiders. With 3,108 species in 186 genera worldwide, the Araneidae comprise one of the largest family of spiders (with the Salticidae and Linyphiidae). Araneid webs are constructed in a stereotypical fashion, where a framework of nonsticky silk is built up before the spider adds a final spiral of silk covered in sticky droplets.

Orb webs are also produced by members of other spider families. The long-jawed orb weavers (Tetragnathidae) were formerly included in the Araneidae; they are closely related, being part of the superfamily Araneoidea. The family Arkyidae has been split off from the Araneidae. The cribellate or hackled orb-weavers (Uloboridae) belong to a different group of spiders. Their webs are strikingly similar, but use a different kind of silk.

Description

Generally, orb-weaving spiders are three-clawed builders of flat webs with sticky spiral capture silk. The building of a web is an engineering feat, begun when the spider floats a line on the wind to another surface. The spider secures the line and then drops another line from the center, making a "Y". The rest of the scaffolding follows with many radii of nonsticky silk being constructed before a final spiral of sticky capture silk.

The third claw is used to walk on the nonsticky part of the web. Characteristically, the prey insect that blunders into the sticky lines is stunned by a quick bite, and then wrapped in silk. If the prey is a venomous insect, such as a wasp, wrapping may precede biting and/or stinging. Much of the orb-spinning spiders' success in capturing insects depends on the web not being visible to the prey, with the stickiness of the web increasing the visibility, thus decreasing the chances of capturing prey. This leads to a trade-off between the visibility of the web and the web's prey-retention ability.

Many orb-weavers build a new web each day. Most orb-weavers tend to be active during the evening hours; they hide for most of the day. Generally, towards evening, the spider consumes the old web, rests for about an hour, then spins a new web in the same general location. Thus, the webs of orb-weavers are generally free of the accumulation of detritus common to other species, such as black widow spiders.

Some orb-weavers do not build webs at all. Members of the genera Mastophora in the Americas, Cladomelea in Africa, and Ordgarius in Australia produce sticky globules, which contain a pheromone analog. The globule is hung from a silken thread dangled by the spider from its front legs. The pheromone analog attracts male moths of only a few species. These get stuck on the globule and are reeled in to be eaten. Both genera of bolas spiders are highly camouflaged and difficult to locate.

In the Araneus diadematus, variables such as wind, web support, temperatures, humidity, and silk supply all proved to be variables in web construction. When studied against the tests of nature, the spiders were able to decide what shape to make their web, how many capture spirals, or the width of their web. Though it could be expected for these spiders to just know these things, it isn't well researched yet as to just how the arachnid knows how to change their web design based on their surroundings. Some scientists suggest that it could be through the spider's spatial learning on their environmental surroundings and the knowing of what will or won't work compared to natural behavioristic rules.

The spiny orb-weaving spiders in the genera Gasteracantha and Micrathena look like plant seeds or thorns hanging in their orb-webs. Some species of Gasteracantha have very long, horn-like spines protruding from their abdomens.

One feature of the webs of some orb-weavers is the stabilimentum, a crisscross band of silk through the center of the web. It is found in several genera, but Argiope – the yellow and banded garden spiders of North America – is a prime example. As orb-weavers age, they tend to have less production of their silk; many adult orb-weavers can then depend on their coloration to attract more of their prey. The band may be a lure for prey, a marker to warn birds away from the web, and a camouflage for the spider when it sits in the web. The stabilimentum may decrease the visibility of the silk to insects, thus making it harder for prey to avoid the web. The orb-web consists of a frame and supporting radii overlaid with a sticky capture spiral, and the silks used by orb-weaver spiders have exceptional mechanical properties to withstand the impact of flying prey. The orb-weaving spider Zygiella x-notata produces a unique orb-web with a characteristic missing sector, similar to other species of the Zygiella genus in the Araneidae family.

During the Cretaceous, a radiation of flowering plants and their insect pollinators occurred. Fossil evidence shows that the orb web was in existence at this time, which permitted a concurrent radiation of the spider predators along with their insect prey. The capacity of orb–webs to absorb the impact of flying prey led orbicularian spiders to become the dominant predators of aerial insects in many ecosystems. Insects and spiders have comparable rates of diversification, suggesting they co-radiated, and the peak of this radiation occurred 100 Mya, before the origin of angiosperms. Vollrath and Selden (2007) make the bold proposition that insect evolution was driven less by flowering plants than by spider predation – particularly through orb webs – as a major selective force. On the other hand some analyses have yielded estimates as high as 265 Mya, with a large number (including Dimitrov et al 2016) intermediate between the two.

Most arachnid webs are vertical and the spiders usually hang with their heads downward. A few webs, such as those of orb-weavers in the genus Metepeira, have the orb hidden within a tangled space of web. Some Metepiera species are semisocial and live in communal webs. In Mexico, such communal webs have been cut out of trees or bushes and used for living fly paper. In 2009, workers at a Baltimore wastewater treatment plant called for help to deal with over 100 million orb-weaver spiders, living in a community that managed to spin a phenomenal web that covered some 4 acres of a building, with spider densities in some areas reaching 35,176 spiders per cubic meter.

Taxonomy 

The oldest known true orb-weaver is Mesozygiella dunlopi, from the Lower Cretaceous. Several fossils provide direct evidence that the three major orb-weaving families, namely the Araneidae, Tetragnathidae, and Uloboridae, had evolved by this time, about 140 Mya. They probably originated during the Jurassic. Based on new molecular evidence in silk genes, all three families are likely to have a common origin.

The two superfamilies, Deinopoidea and Araneoidea, have similar behavioral sequences and spinning apparatuses to produce architecturally similar webs. The latter weave true viscid silk with an aqueous glue property, and the former use dry fibrils and sticky silk. The Deinopoidea (including the Uloboridae), have a cribellum – a flat, complex spinning plate from which the cribellate silk is released.

They also have a calamistrum – an apparatus of bristles used to comb the cribellate silk from the cribellum. The Araneoidea, or the "ecribellate" spiders, do not have these two structures. The two groups of orb-weaving spiders are morphologically very distinct, yet much similarity exists between their web forms and web construction behaviors. The cribellates retained the ancestral character, yet the cribellum was lost in the escribellates. The lack of a functional cribellum in araneoids is most likely synapomorphic.

If the orb-weaver spiders are a monophyletic group, the fact that only some species in the group lost a feature adds to the controversy. The cribellates are split off as a separate taxon that retained the primitive feature, which makes the lineage paraphyletic and not synonymous with any real evolutionary lineage. The morphological and behavioral evidence surrounding orb webs led to the disagreement over a single or a dual origin. While early molecular analysis provided more support for a monophyletic origin, other evidence indicates that orb-weavers evolved earlier phylogenetically than previously thought, and were extinct at least three times during the Cretaceous.

Reproduction
Araneid species either mate at the central hub of the web, where the male slowly traverses the web, trying not to get eaten, and when reaching the hub, mounts the female; or the male constructs a mating thread inside or outside the web to attract the female via vibratory courtship, and if successful, mating occurs on the thread.

In the cannibalistic and polyandrous orb-web spider Argiope bruennichi, the much smaller males are attacked during their first copulation and are cannibalized in up to 80% of the cases. All surviving males die after their second copulation, a pattern observed on other Argiope species. Whether a male survives his first copulation depends on the duration of the genital contact; males that jump off early (before 5 seconds) have a chance of surviving, while males that copulate longer (greater than 10 seconds) invariably die. Prolonged copulation, although associated with cannibalism, enhances sperm transfer and relative paternity.

When males mated with a nonsibling female, the duration of their copulation was prolonged, and consequently the males were cannibalized more frequently. When males mated with a sibling female, they copulated briefly, thus were more likely to escape cannibalism. By escaping, their chance of mating again with an unrelated female likely would be increased. These observations suggest that males can adaptively adjust their investment based on the degree of genetic relatedness of the female to avoid inbreeding depression.

Sexual size dimorphism 
Sexual dimorphism refers to physical differences between males and females of the same species. One such difference can be in size.

Araneids often exhibit size dimorphism typically known as extreme sexual size dimorphism, due to the extent of differences in size. The size difference among species of Araneidae ranges greatly. Some females, such as those of the Nephila pilipes, can be at least 9 times larger than the male, while others are only slightly larger than the male. The larger size female is typically thought to be selected through fecundity selection, the idea that bigger females can produce more eggs, thus more offspring. Although a great deal of evidence points towards the greatest selection pressure on larger female size, some evidence indicates that selection can favor small male size, as well.

Araneids also exhibit a phenomenon called sexual cannibalism, which is commonly found throughout the Araneidae. Evidence suggests a negative correlation between sexual size dimorphism and instances of sexual cannibalism. Other evidence, however, has shown that differences in cannibalistic events among araneids when having smaller or slightly larger males is advantageous.

Some evidence has shown that extreme dimorphism may be the result of males avoiding detection by the females. For males of these species, being smaller in size may be advantageous in moving to the central hub of a web so female spiders may be less likely to detect the male, or even if detected as prey to be eaten, the small size may indicate little nutritional value. Larger-bodied male araneids may be advantageous when mating on a mating thread because the thread is constructed from the edge of the web orb to structural threads or to nearby vegetation. Here larger males may be less likely to be cannibalized, as the males are able to copulate while the female is hanging, which may make them safer from cannibalism. In one subfamily of Araneid that uses a mating thread, Gasteracanthinae, sexual cannibalism is apparently absent despite extreme size dimorphism.

Genera
, the World Spider Catalog accepts the following genera:
Acacesia Simon, 1895 — South America, North America
Acantharachne Tullgren, 1910 — Congo, Madagascar, Cameroon
Acanthepeira Marx, 1883 — North America, Brazil, Cuba
Acroaspis Karsch, 1878 — New Zealand, Australia
Acrosomoides Simon, 1887 — Madagascar, Cameroon, Congo
Actinacantha Simon, 1864 — Indonesia
Actinosoma Holmberg, 1883 — Colombia, Argentina
Aculepeira Chamberlin & Ivie, 1942 — North America, Central America, South America, Asia, Europe
Acusilas Simon, 1895 — Asia
Aethriscus Pocock, 1902 — Congo
Aethrodiscus Strand, 1913 — Central Africa
Aetrocantha Karsch, 1879 — Central Africa
Afracantha Dahl, 1914 — Africa
Agalenatea Archer, 1951 — Ethiopia, Asia
Alenatea Song & Zhu, 1999 — Asia
Allocyclosa Levi, 1999 — United States, Panama, Cuba
Alpaida O. Pickard-Cambridge, 1889 — Central America, South America, Mexico, Caribbean
Amazonepeira Levi, 1989 — South America
Anepsion Strand, 1929 — Oceania, Asia
Aoaraneus Tanikawa, Yamasaki & Petcharad, 2021 — China, Japan, Korea, Taiwan
Arachnura Clerck, 1863
Araneus Clerck, 1757
Araniella Chamberlin & Ivie, 1942 — Asia
Aranoethra Butler, 1873 — Africa
Argiope Audouin, 1826 — Asia, Oceania, Africa, North America, South America, Costa Rica, Cuba, Portugal
Artifex Kallal & Hormiga, 2018 — Australia
Artonis Simon, 1895 — Myanmar, Ethiopia
Aspidolasius Simon, 1887 — South America
Augusta O. Pickard-Cambridge, 1877 — Madagascar
Austracantha Dahl, 1914 — Australia
Backobourkia Framenau, Dupérré, Blackledge & Vink, 2010 — Australia, New Zealand
Bertrana Keyserling, 1884 — South America, Central America
Bijoaraneus Tanikawa, Yamasaki & Petcharad, 2021 — Africa, Asia, Oceania
Caerostris Thorell, 1868 — Africa, Asia
Carepalxis L. Koch, 1872 — Oceania, South America, Mexico, Jamaica
Celaenia Thorell, 1868 — Australia, New Zealand
Cercidia Thorell, 1869 — Russia, Kazakhstan, India
Chorizopes O. Pickard-Cambridge, 1871 — Asia, Madagascar
Chorizopesoides Mi & Wang, 2018 — China, Vietnam
Cladomelea Simon, 1895 — South Africa, Congo
Clitaetra Simon, 1889 — Africa, Sri Lanka
Cnodalia Thorell, 1890 — Indonesia, Japan
Coelossia Simon, 1895 — Sierra Leone, Mauritius, Madagascar
Colaranea Court & Forster, 1988 — New Zealand
Collina Urquhart, 1891 — Australia
Colphepeira Archer, 1941 — United States, Mexico
Courtaraneus Framenau, Vink, McQuillan & Simpson, 2022 — New Zealand
Cryptaranea Court & Forster, 1988 — New Zealand
Cyclosa Menge, 1866 — Caribbean, Asia, Oceania, South America, North America, Central America, Africa, Europe
Cyphalonotus Simon, 1895 — Asia, Africa
Cyrtarachne Thorell, 1868 — Asia, Africa, Oceania
Cyrtobill Framenau & Scharff, 2009 — Australia
Cyrtophora Simon, 1864 — Asia, Oceania, Dominican Republic, Costa Rica, South America, Africa
Deione Thorell, 1898 — Myanmar
Deliochus Simon, 1894 — Australia, Papua New Guinea
Dolophones Walckenaer, 1837 — Australia, Indonesia
Dubiepeira Levi, 1991 — South America
Edricus O. Pickard-Cambridge, 1890 — Mexico, Panama, Ecuador
Enacrosoma Mello-Leitão, 1932 — South America, Central America, Mexico
Encyosaccus Simon, 1895 — South America
Epeiroides Keyserling, 1885 — Costa Rica, Brazil
Eriophora Simon, 1864 — Oceania, United States, South America, Central America, Africa
Eriovixia Archer, 1951 — Asia, Papua New Guinea, Africa
Eustacesia Caporiacco, 1954 — French Guiana
Eustala Simon, 1895 — South America, North America, Central America, Caribbean
Exechocentrus Simon, 1889 — Madagascar
Faradja Grasshoff, 1970 — Congo
Friula O. Pickard-Cambridge, 1897 — Indonesia
Galaporella Levi, 2009 — Ecuador
Gasteracantha Sundevall, 1833 — Oceania, Asia, United States, Africa, Chile
Gastroxya Benoit, 1962 — Africa
Gea C. L. Koch, 1843 — Africa, Oceania, Asia, United States, Argentina
Gibbaranea Archer, 1951 — Asia, Europe, Algeria
Glyptogona Simon, 1884 — Sri Lanka, Italy, Israel
Gnolus Simon, 1879 — Chile, Argentina
Guizygiella Zhu, Kim & Song, 1997 — Asia
Herennia Thorell, 1877 — Asia, Oceania
Heterognatha Nicolet, 1849 — Chile
Heurodes Keyserling, 1886 — Asia, Australia
Hingstepeira Levi, 1995 — South America
Hortophora Framenau & Castanheira, 2021 — Oceania
Hypognatha Guérin, 1839 — South America, Central America, Mexico, Trinidad
Hypsacantha Dahl, 1914 — Africa
Hypsosinga Ausserer, 1871 — Asia, North America, Greenland, Africa
Ideocaira Simon, 1903 — South Africa
Indoetra Kuntner, 2006 — Sri Lanka
Isoxya Simon, 1885 — Africa, Yemen
Kaira O. Pickard-Cambridge, 1889 — North America, South America, Cuba, Guatemala
Kapogea Levi, 1997 — Mexico, South America, Central America
Kilima Grasshoff, 1970 — Congo, Seychelles, Yemen
Larinia Simon, 1874 — Asia, Africa, South America, Europe, Oceania, North America
Lariniaria Grasshoff, 1970 — Asia
Larinioides Caporiacco, 1934 — Asia
Lariniophora Framenau, 2011 — Australia
Leviana Framenau & Kuntner, 2022 — Australia
Leviellus Wunderlich, 2004 — Asia, France
Lewisepeira Levi, 1993 — Panama, Mexico, Jamaica
Lipocrea Thorell, 1878 — Asia, Europe
Macracantha Simon, 1864 — India, China, Indonesia
Madacantha Emerit, 1970 — Madagascar
Mahembea Grasshoff, 1970 — Central and East Africa
Mangora O. Pickard-Cambridge, 1889 — Asia, North America, South America, Central America, Caribbean
Mangrovia Framenau & Castanheira, 2022 — Australia
Manogea Levi, 1997 — South America, Central America, Mexico
Mastophora Holmberg, 1876 — South America, North America, Central America, Cuba
Mecynogea Simon, 1903 — North America, South America, Cuba
Megaraneus Lawrence, 1968 — Africa
Melychiopharis Simon, 1895 — Brazil
Metazygia F. O. Pickard-Cambridge, 1904 — South America, Central America, North America, Caribbean
Metepeira F. O. Pickard-Cambridge, 1903 — North America, Caribbean, South America, Central America
Micrathena Sundevall, 1833 — South America, Caribbean, Central America, North America
Micrepeira Schenkel, 1953 — South America, Costa Rica
Micropoltys Kulczyński, 1911 — Papua New Guinea, Australia
Milonia Thorell, 1890 — Singapore, Indonesia, Myanmar
Molinaranea Mello-Leitão, 1940 — Chile, Argentina
Nemoscolus Simon, 1895 — Africa
Nemosinga Caporiacco, 1947 — Tanzania
Nemospiza Simon, 1903 — South Africa
Neogea Levi, 1983 — Papua New Guinea, India, Indonesia
Neoscona Simon, 1864 — Asia, Africa, Europe, Oceania, North America, Cuba, South America
Nephila Leach, 1815 — Asia, Oceania, United States, Africa, South America
Nephilengys L. Koch, 1872 — Asia, Oceania
Nephilingis Kuntner, 2013 — South America, Africa
Nicolepeira Levi, 2001 — Chile
Novakiella Court & Forster, 1993 — Australia, New Zealand
Novaranea Court & Forster, 1988 — Australia, New Zealand
Nuctenea Simon, 1864 — Algeria, Asia, Europe
Oarces Simon, 1879 — Brazil, Chile, Argentina
Ocrepeira Marx, 1883 — South America, Central America, Caribbean, North America
Ordgarius Keyserling, 1886 — Asia, Oceania
Paralarinia Grasshoff, 1970 — Congo, South Africa
Paraplectana Brito Capello, 1867 — Asia, Africa
Paraplectanoides Keyserling, 1886 — Australia
Pararaneus Caporiacco, 1940 — Madagascar
Paraverrucosa Mello-Leitão, 1939 — South America
Parawixia F. O. Pickard-Cambridge, 1904 — Mexico, South America, Asia, Papua New Guinea, Central America, Trinidad
Parmatergus Emerit, 1994 — Madagascar
Pasilobus Simon, 1895 — Africa, Asia
Perilla Thorell, 1895 — Myanmar, Vietnam, Malaysia
Pherenice Thorell, 1899 — Cameroon
Phonognatha Simon, 1894 — Australia
Pitharatus Simon, 1895 — Malaysia, Indonesia
Plebs Joseph & Framenau, 2012 — Oceania, Asia
Poecilarcys Simon, 1895 — Tunisia
Poecilopachys Simon, 1895 — Oceania
Poltys C. L. Koch, 1843 — Asia, Africa, Oceania
Popperaneus Cabra-García & Hormiga, 2020 — Brazil, Paraguay
Porcataraneus Mi & Peng, 2011 — India, China
Pozonia Schenkel, 1953 — Caribbean, Paraguay, Mexico, Panama
Prasonica Simon, 1895 — Africa, Asia, Oceania
Prasonicella Grasshoff, 1971 — Madagascar, Seychelles
Pronoides Schenkel, 1936 — Asia
Pronous Keyserling, 1881 — Malaysia, Mexico, Central America, South America, Madagascar
Pseudartonis Simon, 1903 — Africa
Pseudopsyllo Strand, 1916 — Cameroon
Psyllo Thorell, 1899 — Cameroon, Congo
Pycnacantha Blackwall, 1865 — Africa
Rubrepeira Levi, 1992 — Mexico, Brazil
Salsa Framenau & Castanheira, 2022 — Australia, New Caledonia, Papua New Guinea
Scoloderus Simon, 1887 — Belize, North America, Argentina, Caribbean
Sedasta Simon, 1894 — West Africa
Singa C. L. Koch, 1836 — Africa, Asia, North America, Europe
Singafrotypa Benoit, 1962 — Africa
Siwa Grasshoff, 1970 — Asia
Socca Framenau, Castanheira & Vink, 2022 — Australia
Spilasma Simon, 1897 — South America, Honduras
Spinepeira Levi, 1995 — Peru
Spintharidius Simon, 1893 — South America, Cuba
Taczanowskia Keyserling, 1879 — Mexico, South America
Talthybia Thorell, 1898 — China, Myanmar
Tatepeira Levi, 1995 — South America, Honduras
Telaprocera Harmer & Framenau, 2008 — Australia
Testudinaria Taczanowski, 1879 — South America, Panama
Thelacantha Hasselt, 1882 — Madagascar, Asia, Australia
Thorellina Berg, 1899 — Myanmar, Papua New Guinea
Togacantha Dahl, 1914 — Africa
Trichonephila Dahl, 1911 — Africa, Asia, Oceania, North America, South America
Umbonata Grasshoff, 1971 — Tanzania
Ursa Simon, 1895 — Asia, South America, South Africa
Verrucosa McCook, 1888 — North America, Panama, South America, Australia
Wagneriana F. O. Pickard-Cambridge, 1904 — South America, Central America, Caribbean, North America
Witica O. Pickard-Cambridge, 1895 — Cuba, Mexico, Peru
Wixia O. Pickard-Cambridge, 1882 — Brazil, Guyana, Bolivia
Xylethrus Simon, 1895 — South America, Mexico, Jamaica, Panama
Yaginumia Archer, 1960 — Asia
Zealaranea Court & Forster, 1988 — New Zealand
Zilla C. L. Koch, 1834 — Azerbaijan, India, China
Zygiella F. O. Pickard-Cambridge, 1902 — North America, Asia, Ukraine, South America

See also

 List of Araneidae species

References

Further reading

External links

 Spiders of Australia
 Spiders of northwestern Europe
 Araneae, Arachnology Home Pages
 World Spider Catalog
 Orb weavers of Kentucky, University of Kentucky
 Pictures of Mangora species
 Gasteracantha cancriformis, spinybacked orbweaver on the University of Florida/Institute of Food and Agricultural Sciences Featured Creatures website
 Neoscona crucifera and N. domiciliorum on the University of Florida/Institute of Food and Agricultural Sciences Featured Creatures website HOE